Palmer Home for Children is a Christian non-profit organization providing residential care without charge and an introduction to God through service, to children who have a need for viable placement, located in and Hernando, Mississippi.

Palmer Home is named after Benjamin M. Palmer, a native of South Carolina and Southern Presbyterian preacher of the Nineteenth Century, who spent nearly 50 years as a pastor at First Presbyterian Church of New Orleans.

Mississippi locations
Palmer Home for Children has two campuses with around 100 children from the age of birth to 18 yrs old. They also own and operate two thrift stores in Columbus, Mississippi and Starkville, Mississippi.

Notes

Non-profit organizations based in Mississippi
Organizations established in 1895
Hernando, Mississippi
Youth organizations based in Mississippi
1895 establishments in Mississippi